The 2018 Kehoe Cup was an inter-county and university hurling competition in the province of Leinster. The competition is ranked below the Walsh Cup and featured weaker teams from Leinster.

Longford were the winners for the first time.

Format

Each team plays the other teams in its group once, earning 2 points for a win and 1 for a draw. The top two teams play in the final.

County teams

Longford
Louth
Wicklow B (second team; players who appeared in the Walsh Cup could not play in the Kehoe Cup team)

Third level team
DCU St. Patrick's Campus

Group stage

Final

References

Kehoe Cup
Kehoe Cup